Immediately upon arrival, in legal usage, is a phrase appearing in directions to a factor to sell goods: as soon after arrival as a sale can be made, irrespective of loss, the factor being precluded from exercising his discretion. See, e.g., Courcier v Ritter (CC Pa) F Cas No 3282.

Legal terminology